Elections to Amber Valley Borough Council were held on 2 May 2002.  One third of the council was up for election and the Conservative Party held overall control of the council.

After the election, the composition of the council was:
Conservative 26
Labour 19

Election result

Ward results

External links
 BBC report of 2002 Amber Valley election result

2002
2002 English local elections
2000s in Derbyshire